Fissurella virescens, also known as the green Panama keyhole limpet, is a species of sea snail, a marine gastropod mollusk in the family Fissurellidae, the keyhole limpets and slit limpets.

Description
The size of the shell differs between 12 mm and 30 mm.

Distribution
This species occurs in the western Pacific Ocean from the Gulf of California to Peru; but not off the Galápagos Islands.

References

External links
 To Barcode of Life (1 barcode)
 To Biodiversity Heritage Library (36 publications)
 To GenBank (3 nucleotides; 2 proteins)
 To USNM Invertebrate Zoology Mollusca Collection
 To World Register of Marine Species
 

Fissurellidae
Gastropods described in 1835